Edmund Gill may refer to:
 Edmund Dwen Gill, Australian scientist
 Edmund Marriner Gill, English landscape painter